was a Japanese imperial crown prince from 681 until his death. He was the second son of Emperor Tenmu. His mother was the empress Unonosarara, today known as Empress Jitō. 

He was the sole child of his mother. According to Nihon Shoki, in 681 he was appointed the crown prince. In the summer of 686 his father, Emperor Temmu, fell ill and gave the imperial authority to his wife Empress Jitō and the crown prince Kusakabe. After the death of his father, he surprisingly did not ascend to the Chrysanthemum Throne. He led the funeral ceremony and the construction of Emperor Temmu's tomb but before the coronation, he died in 689 at the age of 28. He was posthumously titled .

The location of his tomb is uncertain. Some suppose it to be in Takatori, Nara.

He married his paternal cousin and maternal aunt, Princess Abe, the daughter of Emperor Tenji. They had at least three children, Prince Karu, Princess Hidaka and Princess Kibi. After his death, his mother Empress Jitō ascended to the throne. Later, Karu and Hidaka reigned as Emperor Monmu and Empress Genshō. Asakura clan claimed to be from his lineage.

Family 
Parents
Father: Emperor Tenmu (天武天皇, c. 631 – 1 October  686) 
Mother: Empress Jitō (持統天皇, 645 – 13 January 703), Emperor Tenji’s daughter 
Wife: Princess Abe/Ahe (阿閇皇女) later Empress  Genmei, Emperor Tenji's daughter
Princess Hidaka (氷高皇女) later Empress Gensho, first daughter
Prince Karu (珂瑠/軽) later Emperor Monmu, first son
Daughter: Imperial Princess Kibi (吉備内親王, 686–729), Wife of  Prince Nagaya, second daughter

Ancestry

References

Japanese princes
Heirs apparent who never acceded
662 births
689 deaths
Man'yō poets
Sons of emperors